Standard Ethics is an independent sustainability reporting rating agency based in London, known for its sustainable finance and ESG (Environmental, Social and Governance) studies. In 2001, it introduced a standardised approach to sustainability ratings. Methodologically, it separates Corporate Social Responsibility (CSR) from sustainability, seeing the latter as a global and systemic approach whose definition is not given by a single entity but by international institutions. 

Standard Ethics promotes sustainability and corporate governance with the Standard Ethics Rating, an evaluation of how well the companies and sovereign nations respond to corporate governance and sustainability, as indicated by guidelines published by the United Nations, the Organisation for Economic Co-operation and Development, and the European Union.

The Standard Ethics Business Model is based on the applicant-pay model. Like credit rating agencies, Standard Ethics sells solicited ratings, meaning it charges applicants for ratings. Once assigned, the rating and related analysis belongs to the applicant. Conversely, under the investor-pay model, agencies charge investors a fee for a list of companies that warrant investment.

Standard Ethics Rating 
The Standard Ethics Rating (SER) is a Solicited Sustainability Rating (SSR). It is assigned upon a client's request through a direct and regulated bilateral relationship. It is a rating that intends to deliver an evaluation of the level of compliance by companies and sovereign nations in the field of sustainability and corporate governance as indicated by documents and guidelines published by the United Nations (UN), the Organisation for Economic Co-operation and Development (OECD), and The European Union (EU). 

Standard Ethics does not use weights and KPI-based analyses or indicators, but uses a method based on its own proprietary six-group variable algorithm.

Standard Ethics links the rating to an evaluation done both at a qualitative and quantitative level of the potential reputational risks for a company. This process aims to protect corporate assets, particularly corporate reputation. Companies believe that EU, OECD and UN recommendations suggest future legislative requirements. Therefore, complying with this model could bring a competitive advantage.  

The methodological approach of Standard Ethics was first introduced in 2001 and its rating are based on a scale comprising 9 letter grades: EEE; EEE-; EE+; EE; EE-; E+; E; E-; F; where "EEE" stands for ‘above average’; "EE" for ‘average’; and "E" for ‘below average’.

Standard Ethics indices 
Standard Ethics covers the major OECD Stock Exchange markets and the largest listed companies in those markets. In April 2019, Standard Ethics announced its SE European 100 Index, whose Index constituents have been selected according to their dimension, in terms of market capitalisation. 

To date (April 2019), Standard Ethics has created the following Indices: 
 SE European 100 Index (composed of the 100 largest European listed companies based on market capitalisation, with a Standard Ethics Rating).
 SE Italian Index (40 companies within the FTSE-MIB index of the Italian Stock Exchange that have been assigned a Standard Ethics Rating). 
 SE Italian Banks Index (composed of all Italian banks listed on the Italian Stock Exchange with a Standard Ethics Rating).
 SE UK Index (composed of the 40 largest British listed companies with a Standard Ethics Rating).
 SE French Index (composed of the 40 largest French listed companies with a Standard Ethics Rating). 
 SE German Index (composed of the 30 largest German listed companies with a Standard Ethics Rating).
 SE Belgian Index (composed of the 20 largest Belgium listed companies with a Standard Ethics Rating). 
 SE Spanish Index (composed of the 30 largest Spanish listed companies with a Standard Ethics Rating).
 SE Dutch Index (composed of the 30 largest Dutch listed companies with a Standard Ethics Rating).
 SE Swiss Index (composed of the 30 largest Swiss listed companies with a Standard Ethics Rating).
 SE European Banks Index (composed of the 40 largest European listed banks with a Standard Ethics Rating).
 SE Best in Class European Index (composed of the 30 European list companies with the highest Standard Ethics Rating). 
 SE US Index (composed of the 20 largest US listed companies with a Standard Ethics Rating).

The way Standard Ethics reports on its indices is based on full disclosure.

National Ratings
This is the situation for sovereign nations with a Standard Ethics Sustainability Rating as of April 2019. In 2013, Standard Ethics was the first to assign the rating to the Vatican City State.

References

External links 
 Official Website

 Social responsibility organizations